The Airport was a short-lived radio show that aired from January 1995-February 1996.  There were eight half-hour episodes that were broadcast on BBC Radio 4.  It starred Roger Griffiths, Llewella Gideon, Felix Dexter, and Jo Martin. It was produced by Gareth Edwards

Notes and references
Lavalie, John. The Airport. EpGuides. 27 Aug 2005. 29 Jul 2007 

BBC Radio 4 programmes